The Italian Handball Federation (FIGH) (Italian: Federazione Italiana Giuoco Handball) is the governing body of handball and beach handball in Italy. FIGH is affiliated to the Italian National Olympic Committee (CONI), European Handball Federation (EHF) and International Handball Federation (IHF) since 1968.

Presidents

Secretary Generals

Tournaments
 Serie A1 (Men's)
 Serie A1 (Women's)
 Serie A2 (Men's)
 Serie A2 (Women's)

National teams

Handball
 Italy men's national handball team
 Italy men's national junior handball team
 Italy men's national youth handball team
 Italy women's national handball team
 Italy women's national junior handball team
 Italy women's national youth handball team

Beach Handball
 Italy national beach handball team
 Italy women's national beach handball team

References

External links

European Handball Federation
Handball
Handball in Italy
Sports organizations established in 1969
1869 establishments in Italy